The Arboretum Lohbrügge (10 hectares), also known as the Arboretum der Bundesforschungsanstalt für Forst- und Holzwirtschaft or the Arboretum Lohbruegge der Bundesanstalt, is an arboretum with greenhouses maintained by the German Federal Research Center for Forestry and Forest Products (BFH). It is located at Leuschnerstrasse 91, Lohbrügge, Hamburg, Germany, and open by appointment.

The arboretum was established in 1965 by the BFH, Bundesforschungsanstalt für Forst- und Holzwirtschaft. According to Hamann and Seehann, as of 1983 it contained 1541 plant taxa in the arboretum and greenhouse; more recent figures increase that figure to 1570 taxa representing 126 families from all continents, including Taxodium distichum (about 70 years old) and Pinus longaeva.

Its greenhouses (about 700 m2, 14 meters in height) contain about 500 tropical tree species from three climates: tropical, subtropical, and Mediterranean. They include notable specimens of Carapa guianensis, Cedrela odorata, Dalbergia latifolia, Entandrophragma utile, E. cylindricum, Khaya ivorensis, mahogany species, Swietenia macrophylla.

The arboretum also contains a herbarium (3,200 specimens) and a wood collection of 24,000 samples.

See also 
 List of botanical gardens in Germany

References 
 H. Hamann and G. Seehann, The Arboretum of the Federal Research Centre for Forestry and Forest Products, Hamburg-Lohbrügge, Hamburg : M. Wiedebusch, 1983.

External links
 Arboretum und Gewächshausanlage der BFH, Hamburg
 BGCI entry
 Forum Planten entry 
 50 Jahre BFH (with photo)

Buildings and structures in Bergedorf
Lohbrugge, Arboretum
Lohbrugge, Arboretum
Education in Hamburg
Arboreta in Germany
Greenhouses in Germany